The Returning is a 1990 Australia-New Zealand horror film directed by John Day.

References

External links

The Returning at NZ Film Archive
The Returning at NZ Film

1990 films
1990 horror films
Australian horror films
1990s English-language films
1990s Australian films